Denys Olehovych Aleksandrov (born 5 May 1992) is a Ukrainian retired footballer who played as a forward.

External links
 
 Profile at FFU Official Site (Ukr)

1992 births
Living people
Ukrainian footballers
Footballers from Odesa
Association football forwards
FC Chornomorets Odesa players
FC Chornomorets-2 Odesa players
FC Slavia Mozyr players
MFC Mykolaiv players
FC Hirnyk-Sport Horishni Plavni players
Ukrainian First League players
Ukrainian Second League players
Belarusian Premier League players
Ukraine youth international footballers
Ukrainian expatriate footballers
Expatriate footballers in Belarus
Ukrainian expatriate sportspeople in Belarus